The following lists events that happened in 1948 in Iceland.

Incumbents
President – Sveinn Björnsson
Prime Minister – Stefán Jóhann Stefánsson

Events

 KR won the 1948 Úrvalsdeild, the top-flight of Icelandic football.

Births

8 January – Þuríður Backman, politician
14 January – Davíð Oddsson, politician
10 February – Sigurbergur Sigsteinsson, handball player
17 June – Hrafn Gunnlaugsson, film director
17 July – Ögmundur Jónasson, politician.
25 July – Elmar Geirsson, footballer
30 July – Sigurður Pálsson, writer (d. 2017)
7 August – Vilmundur Gylfason, politician, historian and poet (d. 1983)
19 November – Hanna María Karlsdóttir, actress

Deaths

References

 
1940s in Iceland
Iceland
Iceland
Years of the 20th century in Iceland